The THTR-300 was a thorium cycle high-temperature nuclear reactor rated at 300 MW electric (THTR-300) in Hamm-Uentrop, Germany. It started operating in 1983, synchronized with the grid in 1985, operated at full power in February 1987 and was shut down September 1, 1989.
The THTR-300 served as a prototype high-temperature reactor (HTR) to use the TRISO pebble fuel produced by the AVR, an experimental pebble bed  operated by VEW (Vereinigte Elektrizitätswerke Westfalen). The THTR-300 cost €2.05 billion and was predicted to cost an additional €425 million through December 2009 in decommissioning and other associated costs. The German state of North Rhine Westphalia,  Federal Republic of Germany, and Hochtemperatur-Kernkraftwerk GmbH (HKG) financed the THTR-300’s construction.

History
On 4 June 1974, the Council of the European Communities established the Joint Undertaking "Hochtemperatur-Kernkraftwerk GmbH" (HKG).

The electrical generation part of the THTR-300 was finished late due to ever-newer requirements and licensing procedures. It was constructed in Hamm-Uentrop from 1970 to 1983 by Hochtemperatur-Kernkraftwerk GmbH (HKG). Heinz Riesenhuber, Federal Secretary of Research at that time, inaugurated it, and it first went critical on September 13, 1983. It started generating electricity on April 9, 1985, but did not receive permission from the atomic legal authorizing agency to feed electricity to the grid until November 16, 1985. It operated at full power in February 1987 and was shut down September 1, 1989, after operating for less than 16,000 hours.

Because the operator did not expect the decision to decommission the facility, the plant was put into "safe enclosure" status, given that this was the only technical solution for fast decommissioning, especially in consideration of the lack of a final storage facility.

Design

The THTR-300 was a helium-cooled high-temperature reactor with a pebble bed core consisting of approximately 670,000 spherical fuel compacts each  in diameter with particles of uranium-235 and thorium-232 fuel embedded in a graphite matrix. The pressure vessel that contained the pebbles was prestressed concrete.  The THTR-300's power conversion system was similar to the Fort St. Vrain reactor in the USA, in that the reactor coolant transferred the reactor core's heat to water.

The thermal output of the core was 750 megawatts; heat was transferred to the helium coolant, which then transported its heat to water, which then was used to generate electricity via a Rankine cycle. Because this system used a Rankine cycle, water could occasionally ingress into the helium circuit.   The electric conversion system produced 308 megawatts of electricity. The waste heat from the THTR-300 was exhausted using a dry cooling tower.

Incidents 
On May 4, 1986, just 6 months after it had been  connected to the power grid, a fuel pebble became lodged in a fuel feed pipe to the reactor core. Consequently, some radioactive dust was released to the environment. The detection of this very small emission of helium (and dust?) would have not occurred, were it not for environmental groups closely monitoring radiation events in the neighbourhood, since this happened just a couple of days after the Chernobyl disaster. There was a zero tolerance feeling for nuclear incidents, no matter the scale. The Westphalia ministry of commerce created a fact finding committee. After a couple of weeks the power plant was switched on again, but the former supporters withdrew their backing. 

The reactor kept experiencing technical difficulties, with fuel elements breaking more often than anticipated. 

The fuel factory in Hanau was decommissioned for security reasons, endangering the fuel fabrication chain.

It was decided on September 1, 1989 to shut down THTR-300, which was submitted to the supervisory authority by the HKG on September 26, 1989 in accordance with the Atomic Energy Act.

From 1985 to 1989, the THTR-300 registered 16,410 operation hours and generated 2,891,000 MWh. 80 incidents were logged during its 423 full-load operating day lifetime.

Decommissioning 

On September 1, 1989, the THTR-300 was deactivated due to cost and the anti nuclear sentiments after Chernobyl.
In August 1989, the THTR company was almost bankrupted after a long period of shut down due to broken components in the hot gas duct. The German government bailed the company out with 92 million Mark.

THTR-300 was in full service for 423 days.
On October 10, 1991, the  dry cooling tower, which at one time was the highest cooling tower in the world, was explosively dismantled and from October 22, 1993 to April 1995 the remaining fuel was unloaded and transported to the intermediate storage in Ahaus. The remaining facility was "safely enclosed". Dismantling is not expected to start before 2027.

From 2013 to 2017, 23 Million Euro were budgeted for lighting, safeguarding and the storage of the pellets in the interim storage facility in Ahaus. As was determined in 1989, dismantling would begin after approximately 30 years in safe enclosure.

Further development 

By 1992, a group of firms planned to proceed with construction of a HTR-500, the successor of the THTR-300, but up-rated to a thermal output of 1250 megawatts and an electrical output of 500 megawatts. However nothing is currently in any stage of development.

See also 

 Gas cooled fast reactor
 Pebble bed reactor
 Gas Turbine Modular Helium Reactor
 Anti-nuclear movement in Germany

References

External links

General
 THTR homepage 
 
 IAEA HTGR Knowledge Base

IAEA technical documents

 The THTR steam generator: design, manufacture and installation
 Gas-cooled reactor safety and licensing aspects
 THTR steam generator licensing experience as seen by the manufacturer
 Accident analysis and accident control for the THTR - 300 power plant
 Aspects of water and air ingress accidents in HTRs
 Safety concept of high-temperature reactors based on the experience with AVR and THTR
 The behaviour of spherical HTR fuel elements under accident conditions

Joint undertakings of the European Union and European Atomic Energy Community
Energy infrastructure completed in 1985
Former nuclear power stations in Germany
Former nuclear research institutes
Nuclear power stations with closed reactors
Pebble bed reactors
Thorium